The Burke/de Burgh Civil War was a conflict in Ireland from 1333 to 1338 between three leading members of the de Burgh (Burke/Bourke) Anglo-Norman family resulting in the division into three clans.

Background
Twenty-year-old William Donn de Burgh, 3rd Earl of Ulster, known as "the Brown Earl", was murdered by his household knights in June 1333 after he had starved to death his cousin and rival Sir Walter Liath de Burgh in the previous year (1332). The Earl's only child, Elizabeth de Burgh (1332–1363), succeeded as Countess of Ulster and legal heir to the de Burgh estates as an infant. For safety, as an infant and a female heiress, she was taken by her mother to England as her lordships collapsed in a power struggle.

Three members of the de Burgh family fought against each other in an attempt to preserve their own personal estates, and hold overall control of the massive de Burgh inheritance in Ireland. They were:

 Sir Edmond de Burgh of Castleconnell (only surviving uncle of the Brown Earl, and senior member of the de Burgh dynasty) who drowned in Lough Mask in 1338.
 Sir Edmond Albanach de Burgh of north Connacht (cousin of the Brown Earl, brother of the Walter Liath de Burgh who died in 1332)
 Sir Uilleag de Burgh of south Connacht (chief of another illegitimate branch of the de Burghs)

Loss and divisions
The eventual outcome of the war was the loss of almost all the de Burgh lands in Ulster, which was reconquered within a year by the Gaelic-Irish.

The remaining de Burghs in Ireland fragmented into three distinct clans, all of which had several sub-septs. They were:

 Clan William Bourke of County Limerick
 Mac William Íochtar (Bourke) of County Mayo
 Mac William Uachtar or Clanricarde (Burke / de Burgh) of County Galway

Clan William, Mac William, Clanricarde

 Walter de Burgh of Burgh Castle, Norfolk m. Alice
 William de Burgh (d. 1206) m. Daughter of Domnall Mór Ó Briain, King of Thomond
 Richard Mór / Óge de Burgh, 1st Lord of Connaught m. Egidia de Lacy, Lady of Connacht
 Sir Richard de Burgh (d.1248), 2nd Lord of Connaught
 Walter de Burgh, 1st Earl of Ulster (d. 1271)
 Richard Óg de Burgh, 2nd Earl of Ulster (1259–1326)
 John de Burgh m. Elizabeth de Clare
 William Donn de Burgh, 3rd Earl of Ulster (1312–33) m. Maud of Lancaster
 Elizabeth de Burgh, 4th Countess of Ulster (1332–63) m. Lionel of Antwerp, 1st Duke of Clarence
 Philippa Plantagenet, 5th Countess of Ulster (1355–82) m. Edmund Mortimer, 3rd Earl of March
 Roger Mortimer, 4th Earl of March, 6th Earl of Ulster (1374–98)
 Edmund Mortimer, 5th Earl of March, 7th Earl of Ulster (1391–1425)
 Anne Mortimer (1388–1411) m. Richard of Conisburgh, 3rd Earl of Cambridge
 Richard of York, 3rd Duke of York, 8th Earl of Ulster (1411–60)
 Edward IV (Edward, 4th Duke of York, 9th Earl of Ulster)
 House of York (Kings and Queens of England and Ireland)
 Edmond de Burgh
 Sir Richard Burke
 Walter Burke (d. 1432)
 Burkes of Castleconnell and Brittas (Clanwilliam)
 Uileag Carragh Burke
 Burkes of Cois tSiúire (Clanwilliam)
 Sir David Burke, 
 Burkes of Muskerryquirk (Clanwilliam)
 Elizabeth, Queen of Scotland m. Robert I of Scotland
 Theobald de Burgh
 William de Burgh
 Thomas de Burgh
 Egidia de Burgh
 William Óg de Burgh (d. 1270)
 William Liath de Burgh (d. 1324)
 Sir Walter Liath de Burgh, d. 1332
 Sir Edmond Albanach de Burgh (d. 1375),  1st Mac William Íochtar (Lower Mac William), (Mayo)
 Mac William Íochtars, Viscounts Mayo and Earls of Mayo
 John de Burgh (1350–98), Chancellor of the University of Cambridge
 Richard an Fhorbhair de Burgh
 Sir Ulick de Burgh (d. 1343/53), 1st Mac William Uachtar (Upper Mac William) or Clanricarde (Galway)
 Richard Óg Burke (d. 1387)
 Ulick an Fhiona Burke
 Clanricardes, Earls of Marquesses of Clanricarde
 Raymond de Burgh
 Walter Óge de Burgh
 Raymund de Burgh
 Ulick de Burgh of Umhall
 Alice de Burgh
 Margery de Burgh
 Matilda de Burgh
 Daughter de Burgh
 Hubert de Burgh, Bishop of Limerick (d. 1250)
 William de Burgh, Sheriff of Connacht 
 Hubert de Burgh, 1st Earl of Kent (d. 1243) m.
 John de Burgh
 Hubert de Burgh
 Hubert de Burgh
 Barons Burgh
 Geoffrey de Burgh, Bishop of Ely (d. 1228)
 Thomas de Burgh

References
 A New History of Ireland, volume IX, Oxford, 1984;
 Earls of Ulster and Lords of Connacht, 1205-1460 (De Burgh, De Lacy and Mortimer), p. 170; 
 Mac William Burkes: Mac William Iochtar (de Burgh), Lords of Lower Connacht and Viscounts of Mayo, 1332–1649, p. 171;
 Burke of Clanricard: Mac William Uachtar (de Burgh), Lords of Upper Connacht and Earls of Clanricard, 1332–1722.
 Burke:People and Places'', Eamonn de Burca, Dublin, 1995.

See also 

 House of Burgh

1330s in Ireland
1330s conflicts
Civil wars of the Middle Ages
House of Burgh